The Canadian Association of Sign Language Interpreters (CASLI), formally the Association of Visual Language Interpreters of Canada (AVLIC), is a professional association that represents interpreters in Canada whose working languages are English, American Sign Language (ASL), French and Langue des signes québécoise (LSQ).

See also 
 International Federation of Translators

References

External links
 AVLIC website

Association of Visual Language Interpreters of Canada (AVLIC)
Interpreters associations
Sign language
Deafness organizations